{{DISPLAYTITLE:Fluoroethyl-L-tyrosine (18F)}}

Fluoroethyl--tyrosine (18F) or 18F-FET is a neuro-oncologic PET tracer.

See also 
 Fluoroethyl

References 

PET radiotracers
Amino acid derivatives
Phenol ethers
Fluoroethyl ethers